Lorhon, or Teen, is a Gur language of Ivory Coast and across the border in Burkina Faso.

As with Doghose, there are spelling variants to accommodate the sound : Loghon, Lorhon, Loron. Other names are Nabe, Tegesie, Ténhé, and Tuni.

References

Kulango languages
Languages of Ivory Coast